Fusinus buzzurroi is a species of sea snail, a marine gastropod mollusc in the family Fasciolariidae.

The type locality is Mljet Island, Croatia.

References

buzzurroi
Gastropods described in 2008